Muhammad bin Khalifa Al Khalifa (محمد بن خليفة بن سلمان آل خليفة; died 1890) was the ruler of Bahrain between 1843 and 1868. He was the sixth monarch of the Al Khalifa dynasty.

Early life and struggle
Muhammad was the grandson of Salman bin Ahmed, co-ruler of Bahrain, and had four brothers, Ali, Duaij, Salman and Rashid. Muhammad served as the governor of Manama. When his father, Khalifa bin Salman, died in 1834 he succeeded him as the co-ruler, but with diminished power. In 1842 Muhammad challenged the reign of his grand uncle Abdullah bin Ahmad Al Khalifa and declared himself as the ruler of Bahrain and Qatar. However, soon Muhammad was defeated in the battle of al Nasfah against Abdullah bin Ahmad Al Khalifa and took refuge in the Emirate of Najd under the protection of Saudi ruler Abdullah bin Thunayan.

Reign and abdication
In early 1843 Muhammad returned to Qatar and then to Bahrain, and in April 1843 he defeated Abdullah bin Ahmad Al Khalifa becoming the ruler. During his reign Muhammad paid an annual tribute to Faisal bin Turki, successor of Abdullah bin Thunayan as the Emir of Najd. However, in 1850 he began not to pay the amount, and next year Muhammad attempted to get support from the Ottomans, but his attempt was not fruitful. Abdullah bin Faisal, son of the ruler of Najd, managed to reach an agreement with Muhammad through the mediation of Said bin Tahnoon, the ruler of Abu Dhabi.

Muhammad signed a treaty with the British in 1856 whereby he guaranteed that he would capture the British vessels carrying war slaves in his territories and to ban his or his subjects' vessels from carrying slaves. In 1860 Muhammad asked the Persians to be the protector of his reign due to the restrictions on his actions imposed by the British due the treaty mentioned above, and his proposal was welcomed by them, but was not materialized. Muhammad and his brother Ali was forced by the British Resident, Commander Felix Jones to sign a convention, and the convention effectively integrated Bahrain into the Trucial System in 1861. 

Muhammad abdicated as a result of the British intervention after an alleged violation of the 1861 convention which prevented him from carrying out maritime depredations. In 1867 he and the sheikhs of Abu Dhabi attacked the coast of Qatar which led to great damage in the region, and this incident accelerated his deposition by the British. Muhammad fled country in 1868 and first went to Khor Hassan in Qatar before settling in Qatif. He was succeeded by his brother, Ali bin Khalifa Al Khalifa, who was killed by the forces of Muhammad bin Abdullah Al Khalifa in 1869. The British forces captured Muhammad and sent him to a prison in India. In addition, due to the extensive intrafamilial fractions Britain blockaded the islands of Bahrain and took all of the Al Khalifa members into custody imposing conditions that resulted in the changing the ruler. They appointed Isa bin Ali Al Khalifa as the new ruler of Bahrain.

In 1888 Muhammad was freed from the Indian prison and brought to Mecca where he lived as a pensioner of the Ottomans until his death in 1890.

References

External links

19th-century monarchs in the Middle East
1890 deaths
Bahraini monarchs
Bahraini prisoners and detainees
19th century in Bahrain
House of Khalifa
Monarchs who abdicated
Year of birth missing
Arabs from the Ottoman Empire